Elissa Helene McCracken is an American beauty pageant titleholder from Ada, Ohio who was named Miss Ohio 2012.

Biography
She won the title of Miss Ohio on June 23, 2012, when she received her crown from outgoing titleholder Ellen Bryan. McCracken's platform is “Stop Cyber Bullying!”, and her competition talent was a piano arrangement of “Cumana.” McCracken is a fourth-year pharmacy student at Ohio Northern University.

References

External links

 
 

Miss America 2013 delegates
Living people
Ohio Northern University alumni
American beauty pageant winners
Women in Ohio
People from Ada, Ohio
People from Waynesburg, Pennsylvania
Year of birth missing (living people)